Mohamed Bairouti (born 29 January 1976) is a former Syrian footballer who played for Syria national football team.

References

External links
worldfootball.net
11v11.com

1976 births
Syrian footballers
Living people
Syria international footballers
Sportspeople from Aleppo
Al-Jaish Damascus players
Al-Wahda SC (Syria) players
Al-Ittihad Aleppo players
Hurriya SC players
Association football goalkeepers
Syrian Premier League players